Baniyas is a port city in Syria.

Baniyas or Banias may also refer to:

Places and jurisdictions 
 Banias, the site of the ancient city of Caesarea Philippi, now in the Golan Heights 
 Banias River, in the Golan Heights
 Baniyas District, a local government district 
 Baniyas, Abu Dhabi, United Arab Emirates

Other uses 
 Bani Yas, a tribal confederation in the United Arab Emirates
 Banias (microprocessor), a Pentium M device
 members of the Bania (caste), a community in India
 members of the Bania (Newar caste), a community in Nepal

See also 

 Bania (disambiguation)
 Banya (disambiguation)
 Melkite Greek Catholic Archeparchy of Baniyas, a diocese in Lebanon